Yohanes Chiappinelli (born 18 August 1997) is an Ethiopian-born Italian male middle-distance runner and steeplechaser.

Chiappinelli is an athlete of the Centro Sportivo Carabinieri.

Biography
He won two gold medals in 3000 metres steeplechase at 2015 European Athletics U20 Championships and 2017 European Athletics U23 Championships.

Personal best
3000 m steeplechase: 8:24.68 -  Rome, 6 June 2019

Achievements

National titles
He won two national championships at individual senior level.

 Italian Athletics Championships
Half marathon: 2022

Italian Cross Country Championships
Cross country running: 2018

References

External links
 

1997 births
Living people
Italian male cross country runners
Italian male middle-distance runners
Italian male steeplechase runners
Italian sportspeople of African descent
World Athletics Championships athletes for Italy
European Championships (multi-sport event) bronze medalists
European Athletics Championships medalists
Ethiopian emigrants to Italy
Naturalised citizens of Italy
Mediterranean Games bronze medalists for Italy
Mediterranean Games medalists in athletics
Athletes (track and field) at the 2018 Mediterranean Games
Athletics competitors of Centro Sportivo Carabinieri